Baby Daddy is an American sitcom that premiered on Freeform (then known as ABC Family) on June 20, 2012. The sitcom stars Jean-Luc Bilodeau as Ben Wheeler, a bartender, who while moving his brother Danny Wheeler (Derek Theler) into the apartment Ben shares with best friend Tucker Dobbs (Tahj Mowry), he's surprised when Emma, a baby girl, is left on his doorstep by Angela, a girl with whom he had a one-night stand. He gets help from his mother Bonnie Wheeler (Melissa Peterman) and his close female friend Riley Perrin (Chelsea Kane) who also is in love with him.

Series overview

Episodes

Season 1 (2012)

Season 2 (2013) 
The second season premiered on May 29, 2013. Matt Dallas, who previously worked with Jean-Luc Bilodeau on the ABC Family series Kyle XY, appeared in a recurring role as Fitch Douglas, a love interest for Riley. Both Lacey Chabert and Grace Phipps also had recurring roles this season. Wayne Brady guest starred in the episode "There's Something Fitchy Going On".

Season 3 (2014) 
The third season premiered on January 15, 2014. Bruce Thomas, who previously worked with Jean-Luc Bilodeau on Kyle XY, guest starred in the episode "The Bet". Bilodeau's other Kyle XY co-star Matt Dallas reprised his role as Fitch in the episode "Lights! Camera! No Action!". Mary Hart also guest starred as herself in that episode. Other guest stars this season included Lucy Hale, David DeLuise, Phil Morris, Mark DeCarlo, Kelsey Chow and Dot-Marie Jones.

{{Episode table
| background      = #87A96B
| overall         = 
| season          = 
| title           = 
| director        = 
| writer          = 
| airdate         = 
| airdateR        = 
| prodcode        = 
| prodcodeR       =
| viewers         = 
| country         = U.S.
| episodes        = 

{{Episode list
| EpisodeNumber   = 39
| EpisodeNumber2  = 13
| Title           = Play It Again, Bonnie
| DirectedBy      = Michael Lembeck
| WrittenBy       = Dan Berendsen & Heidi Clements
| OriginalAirDate = 
| ProdCode        = 3013
| Viewers         = 0.88<ref>{{cite web|url=http://tvbythenumbers.zap2it.com/2014/04/17/wednesday-cable-ratings-american-pickers-wins-night-nba-basketball-bring-it-melissa-joey-the-americans-more/254829/|title=Wednesday Cable Ratings: 'American Pickers' Wins Night, NBA Basketball, 'Bring It!, Melissa & Joey', 'The Americans' & More|last=Bibel|first=Sara|work=TV by the Numbers|date=April 17, 2014|accessdate=April 17, 2014|archive-url=https://web.archive.org/web/20140418234530/http://tvbythenumbers.zap2it.com/2014/04/17/wednesday-cable-ratings-american-pickers-wins-night-nba-basketball-bring-it-melissa-joey-the-americans-more/254829/|archive-date=April 18, 2014|url-status=dead}}</ref>
| ShortSummary    = Bonnie still has feelings for Brad and asks for Tucker's help to get him back. Brad has the same feelings for Bonnie, but is encouraged by Ben to date someone else, after Bonnie tells Ben, Tucker and Danny prior, that she is over Brad, before changing her mind. Danny helps Riley and Margot have a better mother-daughter relationship and is upset that Margot allowed Riley to let Philip move into Riley's place.
| LineColor       = 87A96B
}}

}}

 Season 4 (2014–15) 
The fourth season premiered on October 22, 2014, with the series' first Halloween episode "Strip or Treat". The second Christmas episode of the series entitled "It's a Wonderful Emma" premiered on December 10. Aisha Dee guest starred as Olivia, Tucker's ex-wife. Christa B. Allen appeared in a recurring role as Robyn, a corporate lawyer working at Riley's law firm, who later begins dating Danny. Eddie Cibrian appeared in a multi-episode arc as Ross, a guy that Riley falls for, later discovering that he is her boss. Jackée Harry guest starred as Judge Johnson in the episode "Lowering the Bar". The episode reunited Harry with Tahj Mowry, Mowry made numerous guest appearances on Harry's 1990s sitcom Sister, Sister. In the episode "Home Is Where the Wheeler Is", Alex Kapp Horner is now playing the role of Jennifer, Riley's mom, which was originally played by Caroline Rhea in season 2 episode "On The Lamb-y". Reba McEntire guest starred in the season finale "It's a Nice Day for a Wheeler Wedding", reuniting with her former Reba'' co-star Melissa Peterman.

Season 5 (2016) 
The fifth season premiered on February 3, 2016, under ABC Family's new name Freeform. Allie Gonino was cast in a recurring role as Sam Saffe, a girl who applies for the manager position at the Bar on B. Ben also had a crush on her in high school and she was not very nice to Riley during that time. However, for unknown reasons, Daniella Monet replaced Gonino in the role. Production on the season began in August 2015 and was temporarily halted on October 26, after Jean-Luc Bilodeau was hospitalized the weekend before.

Season 6 (2017) 
The sixth season and the final season premiered on March 13, 2017, ending with the 100th episode.

Ratings

References

Lists of American sitcom episodes